is a subordinate unified command of the United States Indo-Pacific Command (USINDOPACOM). It was activated at Fuchū Air Station in Tokyo, Japan, on 1 July 1957 to replace the Far East Command. USFJ is commanded by the Commander, US Forces Japan (COMUSJAPAN) who is dual-hatted as commander of the Fifth Air Force. U.S. Forces Japan is currently headquartered at Yokota Air Base in Tokyo.

U.S. Forces Japan plans, directs, and supervises the execution of missions and responsibilities assigned by the Indo-Pacific Command; they establish and implement policies to accomplish the mission of the United States Armed Forces in Japan and are responsible for developing plans for the defense of the country.
USFJ supports the Security Treaty and administers the Status of Forces Agreement (SOFA) between the United States and Japan. They are responsible for coordinating various matters of interest with the service commanders in Japan. These include matters affecting US-Japan relationships among and between the United States Department of Defense; DOD agencies and the U.S. Ambassador to Japan; and DOD agencies and the Government of Japan (GOJ).

Under the Treaty of Mutual Cooperation and Security between the United States and Japan, the United States is obliged to provide Japan – in close cooperation with the Japan Self-Defense Forces – with maritime defense, ballistic missile defense, domestic air control, communications security, and disaster response.

History

After the Japanese surrender at the end of World War II in Asia, the United States Armed Forces assumed administrative authority in Japan. The Japanese Imperial Army and Navy were decommissioned, and the U.S. Armed Forces took control of Japanese military bases until a new government could be formed and positioned to reestablish authority. Allied forces planned to demilitarize Japan, and the new government adopted the Constitution of Japan with a no-armed-force clause in 1947.

After the Korean War began in 1950, Douglas MacArthur, the Supreme Commander for the Allied Powers in Japan and the Japanese government established the paramilitary "National Police Reserve", which was later developed into the Japan Ground Self-Defense Force (JGSDF).

In 1951, the Treaty of San Francisco was signed by the allied countries and Japan, which restored its formal sovereignty. At the same time, the U.S. and Japan signed the Japan-America Security Alliance. By this treaty, USFJ is responsible for the defense of Japan. As part of this agreement, the Japanese government requested that the U.S. military bases remain in Japan, and agreed to provide funds and various interests specified in the Status of Forces Agreement. At the expiration of the treaty, the United States and Japan signed the new Treaty of Mutual Cooperation and Security between the United States and Japan. The status of the United States Forces Japan was defined in the U.S.–Japan Status of Forces Agreement. This treaty is still in effect, and it forms the basis of Japan's foreign policy.

During the Vietnam War, US military bases in Japan, especially those in the Okinawa Prefecture, were used as important strategic and logistic bases. In 1970, the Koza riot occurred against the US military presence on Okinawa. The USAF strategic bombers were deployed in the bases on Okinawa, which were still administered by the U.S. government. Before the 1972 reversion of the island to Japanese administration, it has been speculated but never confirmed that up to 1,200 nuclear weapons may have been stored at Kadena Air Base on Okinawa during the 1960s.

, there are approximately 50,000 U.S. military personnel stationed in Japan, along with approximately 40,000 dependents of military personnel and another 5,500 American civilians employed there by the United States Department of Defense. The United States Seventh Fleet is based in Yokosuka, Kanagawa Prefecture.  The 3rd Marine Expeditionary Force (III MEF) is based on Okinawa. 130 USAF fighters are stationed in the Misawa Air Base and Kadena Air Base.

The Japanese government paid ¥217 billion (US$2.0 billion) in 2007 as annual host-nation support called .  As of the 2011 budget, such payment was no longer to be referred to as omoiyari yosan or "sympathy budget". Japan compensates 75 percent of U.S. basing costs — $4.4 billion.

Immediately after the 2011 Tōhoku earthquake and tsunami, 9,720 dependents of United States military and government civilian employees in Japan evacuated the country, mainly to the United States.

The relocation of the U.S. Marine Corps Air Station Futenma to Henoko was resolved in December 2013 with the signing of a landfill agreement by the governor of Okinawa. Under the terms of the U.S.-Japan agreement, five thousand U.S. Marines were relocated to Guam and four thousand U.S. Marines to other Pacific locations such as Hawaii or Australia while around ten thousand Marines were to remain on Okinawa. No timetable for the Marines redeployment was announced, but The Washington Post reported that U.S. Marines would leave Okinawa as soon as suitable facilities on Guam and elsewhere were ready. The relocation move was expected to cost 8.6 billion US dollars,  including a $3.1bn cash commitment from Japan for the move to Guam as well as for developing joint training ranges on Guam and on Tinian and Pagan in the Northern Mariana Islands. Certain parcels of land on Okinawa which were leased for use by the American military were supposed to be turned back to Japanese control via a long-term phased return process according to the agreement. These returns have been ongoing since 1972. In October 2020, Marine Corps Base Camp Blaz was activated on Guam. The new base is meant to house marines relocated from Okinawa, with the final relocation planned for 2025.

In May 2014, in a strategic shift by the United States to Asia and the Pacific, it was revealed the US was deploying two unarmed Global Hawk long-distance surveillance drones to Japan for surveillance missions over China and North Korea.

United States presence debate
As of May 2022, the stationing of U.S. military personnel at military facilities across Okinawa Island remains a hotly-contested and controversial issue, with the relocation of Marine Corps Air Station Futenma often being at the forefront of protests against the presence of U.S. military presence on the island. Despite an agreement to relocate Marine Corps Air Station Futenma first being reached by the Japanese and U.S. governments in 1996, progress to relocate the base has stalled due to widespread anti-base protests across Okinawa centering on concerns relating to crimes perpetrated by U.S. military personnel stationed on Okinawa and the existence of environmental pollution resulting from the construction, operation and potential relocation of U.S. military bases on Okinawa.
Okinawa makes up only 0.6 percent of the nation's land area; yet, approximately 62% of United States bases in Japan (exclusive use only) are on Okinawa.

The U.S. government employs over eight thousand Master Labor Contract (MLC)/Indirect Hire Agreement (IHA) workers on Okinawa (per the Labor Management Organization), not including Okinawan contract workers.

Survey among Japanese
In 2002, 73.4% of Japanese citizens stated that the Japan-US security treaty is useful for Japan's peace and security but part of the population demands a reduction in the number of U.S. military bases on Okinawa.

In May 2010, a survey of the Okinawan people conducted by the Mainichi Shimbun and the Ryūkyū Shimpō, found that 71% of Okinawans surveyed thought that the presence of Marines on Okinawa was not necessary (15% said it was necessary). When asked what they thought about 62% of exclusive use United States Forces Japan bases being concentrated on Okinawa, 50% said that the number should be reduced and 41% said that the bases should be removed. When asked about the US-Japan security treaty, 55% said it should be a peace treaty, 14% said it should be abolished, and 7% said it should be maintained.

Many of the bases, such as Yokota Air Base, Naval Air Facility Atsugi and Kadena Air Base, are located in the vicinity of residential districts, and local citizens have complained about excessive aircraft noise. The 2014 poll by Ryūkyū Shimpō found that 80% of surveyed Okinawans want the Marine Corps Air Station Futenma moved out of the prefecture.

On 25 June 2018, Okinawan residents protested against the construction of a new airfield intended for the US military base in the United States. The activists, armed with placards and banners, went to sea on seventy boats and ships.  Protesters urged the Japanese authorities to stop the expansion of the US military presence on the island. Some of the boats went to the guarded construction site, where they came across the Coast Guard patrol vessels. Some activists were arrested for entering a prohibited zone.

On 11 August 2018, about 70,000 protesters gathered at a park in the prefecture capital of Naha to protest the planned relocation of a U.S military base on the southern Japanese island. Opponents of the relocation say the plan to move U.S. Marine Corps Air Station Futenma from a crowded neighborhood to a less-populated coastal site would not only affect the environment, but would also go against local wishes to have the base moved from the island entirely.

Status of forces agreement
There is also debate over the Status of Forces Agreement due to the fact that it covers a variety of administrative technicalities blending the systems which control how certain situations are handled between the U.S.'s and Japan's legal framework.

United States service member behavior
Between 1972 and 2009, U.S. servicemen committed 5,634 criminal offenses, including 25 murders, 385 burglaries, 25 arsons, 127 rapes, 306 assaults, and 2,827 thefts.  Yet, per Marine Corps Installations Pacific data, U.S. service members are convicted of far fewer crimes than local Okinawans. According to the U.S.-Japan Status of Forces Agreement, when U.S. personnel crimes are committed both off-duty and off-base, they should always be prosecuted under the Japanese law.

On 12 February 2008, the National Police Agency (of Japan) or NPA, released its annual criminal statistics that included activity within the Okinawa prefecture. These findings held American troops were only convicted of 53 crimes per 10,000 U.S. male servicemen, while Okinawan males were convicted of 366 crimes per 10,000. The crime rate found a U.S. serviceman on Okinawa to be 86% less likely to be convicted of a crime by the Japanese government than an Okinawan male.

Crime

At the beginning of the occupation of Japan, in 1945, many U.S. soldiers participated in the Special Comfort Facility Association. The Japanese government enslaved 55,000 women to work providing sexual services to US military personnel. The Association was closed by the Supreme Commander for the Allied Powers.

In more recent history, "crimes ranging from rape to assault and hit-and-run accidents by U.S. military personnel, dependents and civilians have long sparked protests in the prefecture," stated The Japan Times. "A series of horrific crimes by present and former U.S. military personnel stationed on Okinawa has triggered dramatic moves to try to reduce the American presence on the island and in Japan as a whole," commented The Daily Beast in 2009.

In 1995, the abduction and rape of a 12-year-old Okinawan schoolgirl by two U.S. Marines and one U.S. sailor led to demands for the removal of all U.S. military bases in Japan. Other controversial incidents include helicopter crashes, the Girard incident in 1957, the Michael Brown Okinawa assault incident in 2002, the death of the Kinjo family in 1996, and the hit-and-run death of Yuki Uema in 1998. In February 2008, a 38-year-old U.S. Marine based on Okinawa was arrested in connection with the reported rape of a 14-year-old Okinawan girl. This triggered waves of protest against American military presence on Okinawa and led to tight restrictions on off-base activities. Although the accuser withdrew her charges, the U.S. military court-martialed the suspect and sentenced him to four years in prison under the stricter rules of the military justice system.

U.S. Forces Japan designated 22 February as a "Day of Reflection" for all U.S. military facilities in Japan, and established the Sexual Assault Prevention and Response Task Force in an effort to prevent similar incidents. In November 2009, Staff Sgt. Clyde "Drew" Gunn, a U.S. Army soldier stationed at Torii Station was involved in a hit-and-run accident of a pedestrian in Yomitan Village on Okinawa. Later, in April 2010, the soldier was charged with failing to render aid and vehicular manslaughter. Staff Sgt. Gunn, of Ocean Springs, Mississippi, was eventually sentenced to two years and eight months in jail on 15 October 2010.

In 2013, two U.S. military personnel, Seaman Christopher Browning of Athens, Texas, and Petty Officer 3rd Class Skyler Dozierwalker of Muskogee, Oklahoma, were found guilty by the Naha District Court of raping and robbing a woman in her 20s in a parking lot in October. Both admitted committing the crime. The case outraged many Okinawans, a number of whom have long complained of military-related crime on their island, which hosts thousands of U.S. troops. It also sparked tougher restrictions for all 50,000 U.S. military personnel in Japan, including a curfew and drinking restrictions.

On 13 May 2013, in a controversial statement, Toru Hashimoto, co-leader of the Japan Restoration Association said to a senior American military official at the Marine Corps base on Okinawa that "we can’t control the sexual energy of these brave marines." He said that United States soldiers should make more use of the local adult entertainment industry to reduce sexual crimes against local women. Hashimoto also spoke of the necessity of former Japanese Army comfort women and of prostitutes for the U.S. military in other countries such as Korea.

In June 2016, after a civilian worker at the base was charged with murdering a Japanese woman, thousands of people protested on Okinawa. Organizers estimated turnout at 65,000 people, which was the largest anti-base protests on Okinawa since 1995.

In November 2017, an intoxicated U.S. service member was arrested following a vehicle crash on Okinawa that killed the other driver.

Osprey deployment on Okinawa
In October 2012, twelve MV-22 Ospreys were transferred to the US Marine Corps Air Station Futenma to replace aging Vietnam-era Boeing Vertol CH-46 Sea Knight helicopters on Okinawa. In October 2013, an additional 12 Ospreys arrived, again to replace CH-46 Sea Knights, increasing the number of Ospreys to 24. Japanese Defense Minister Satoshi Morimoto explained that the Osprey aircraft is safe, adding that two recent accidents were "caused by human factors". Japanese Prime Minister Yoshihiko Noda also stated that the Japanese government was convinced of the MV-22's safety.
Various incidents involving V-22 Ospreys have occurred on Okinawa. On 5 April 2018, it was announced that the U.S. Air Force would officially deploy CV-22 Osprey aircraft at its Yokota Air Base on the outskirts of Tokyo. The deployment would be the first of Ospreys in Japan other than on Okinawa, where the U.S. Marines had already deployed their version of the aircraft, known as the MV-22s.

Environmental concerns

More recently, environmental concerns have taken the forefront of the debate over the presence of U.S. military forces on the island of Okinawa. Since the late 1990s, environmental concerns elevated by both local residents as well as larger Okinawan and Japanese environmental action groups and independent activists have often resulted in public protests and demonstrations against the relocation of existing U.S. military bases and the construction of new replacement facilities, which have been labelled by some as examples of "modern colonialism". In particular, lingering environmental concerns over the disruption or destruction of coastal and marine habitats off the shores of Okinawa from construction, relocation and operation of U.S. military bases on Okinawa, has resulted in the protracted and continuing delayal of plans to relocate military facilities, such as Marine Corps Air Station Futenma.

Okinawa dugong lawsuit 
During the late 1990s and early 2000s, initial plans to relocate Marine Corps Air Station Futenma to a new facility located offshore in Henoko Bay were met with strong resistance after sightings of dugong were reported in areas surrounding territory earmarked for the relocated airbase. A critically endangered species, dugong were traditionally fished and hunted throughout Okinawa and the Ryukyu Islands. This drew the attention of local, national and international environmental action groups, who raised concerns that land reclamation projects tied to the construction of a new offshore airbase in Henoko Bay would result in the destruction of nearby dugong habitats and coastal ecosystems. Despite this, plans were set forth to continue ahead with the relocation of the base, notably, flouting the results of a 1997 referendum where the majority voted to reject a replacement facility.

In opposition to this, in September 2003, a group of Okinawan, Japanese and U.S. environmental organizations filed a lawsuit in San Francisco Federal Court to protest the relocation of Marine Corps Air Station Futenma. This lawsuit, initially entitled Okinawa Dugong v. Rumsfeld, argued that the U.S. Department of Defense failed to consider the impacts that relocating the base would have upon the local dugong population, in turn, violating the U.S. National Historic Preservation Act. This case was closed in January 2008; notably for the plaintiffs, it was ruled that the Department of Defense, by not considering the impacts of the relocated airbase upon the local dugong population, had in fact violated the National Historic Preservation Act, thus delaying the relocation of the base.

Water contamination 
Concerns over water contamination have also exasperated recent tensions surrounding the presence of U.S. military bases in Okinawa. In June 2020, following the announcement of an earlier leak of firefighting foam from Marine Corps Air Station Futenma in April 2020, a water quality study conducted by the Japanese Ministry of the Environment published findings of elevated contamination levels of PFOS and PFOA at 37 different water sources near U.S. military bases and industrial areas which exceeded provisional national targets. Further incidents concerning the release of the cancer-inducing toxins also occurred in August 2021, further worsening tensions over the presence of 'alarming' levels of these toxic chemicals.

Subsequent tests around Kadena Air Base, specifically the training site 50 meters west of Dakujaku River, confirmed severe contamination in the water system with PFAS chemicals. These chemicals reach 10s of meters underground while plumes spread for several kilometers from these contaminated training sites flowed into nearby wells and waterways of Dakujaku River and Hija River which contaminated the drinking water of 450,000 residents. These toxic chemicals originate from firefighting foams which contain PFAS and were used at training sites of oversees US facilities during the 1970s and 80s. However, the US and Japanese governments say that the source of the issue cannot be confirmed.

Facilities

List of current facilities

The USFJ headquarters is at Yokota Air Base, about 30 km west of central Tokyo.

The U.S. military installations in Japan and their managing branches are as follows:

The table above show 84 in total.

 Camp Smedley D. Butler, Okinawa Prefecture, Yamaguchi Prefectures. (Although these camps are dispersed throughout Okinawa and the rest of Japan they are all under the heading of Camp Smedley D. Butler):
 Camp McTureous, Okinawa Prefecture
 Camp Courtney, Okinawa Prefecture
 Camp Foster, Okinawa Prefecture
 Camp Kinser, Okinawa Prefecture
 Camp Hansen, Okinawa Prefecture
 Camp Schwab, Okinawa Prefecture
 Camp Gonsalves (Jungle Warfare Training Center), Okinawa Prefecture
 Kin Blue Beach Training Area, Okinawa Prefecture
 Kin Red Beach Training Area, Okinawa Prefecture
 Higashionna Ammunition Storage Point II
 Henoko Ordnance Ammunition Depot
 Marine Corps Air Station Futenma, Okinawa Prefecture (return after the MCAS Futenma relocates to Camp Schwab)
 Marine Corps Air Station Iwakuni
 Camp Fuji, Shizuoka Prefecture
 Numazu Training Area, Shizuoka Prefecture
 Ie Jima Auxiliary Airfield, Okinawa Prefecture
 Tsuken Jima Training Area, Okinawa Prefecture

JSDF-USFJ Joint Use Facilities and Areas

Temporary use facilities and areas are as follows:

On Okinawa, U.S. military installations occupy about 10.4 percent of the total land usage.  Approximately 74.7 percent of all the U.S. military facilities in Japan are located on the island of Okinawa.

List of former facilities
The United States has returned some facilities to Japanese control. Some are used as military bases of the JSDF; others have become civilian airports or government offices; many are factories, office buildings or residential developments in the private sector. Due to the Special Actions Committee on Okinawa, more land on Okinawa is in the process of being returned.
 Army STRATCOM Warehouse (later, Urasoe Warehouse), Urasoe, Okinawa
 Bluff Area (later, Yamate Dependent Housing Area), Yokohama, Kanagawa
 Bolo Point Auxiliary Airfield (later, Trainfire Range), Yomitan, Okinawa
 Bolo Point Army Annex, Yomitan, Okinawa
 Camp Bender, Ōta, Gunma
 Camp Boone, Ginowan, Okinawa
 Camp Burness, Chūō, Tokyo
 Camp Chickamauga, 19th Infantry, Beppu, Oita
 Camp Chigasaki, Chigasaki, Kanagawa
 Camp Chitose Annex (Chitose I, II), Chitose, Hokkaido
 Camp Coe, Yokohama, Kanagawa
 Camp Crawford, Sapporo, Hokkaido
 Camp Drake, Asaka, Saitama
 Camp Drew, Ōizumi, Gunma
 Camp Eta Jima, Etajima, Hiroshima
 Camp Fowler, Sendai, Miyagi
 Camp Fuchinobe (Office Japan, NSAPACREP), Sagamihara, Kanagawa
 Camp Hakata, Higashi-ku, Fukuoka
 Camp Hardy, Ginoza, Okinawa
 Camp Haugen, Hachinohe, Aomori
 Camp Katakai, Kujūkuri, Chiba
 Camp King (later, Omiya Ordnance Sub Depot), Omiya, Saitama
 Camp Kokura, Kitakyushu, Fukuoka
 Camp Kubasaki (later, Kubasaki School Area), [Nakagusuku, Okinawa]
 Camp Loper, Tagajō, Miyagi
 Camp McGill, Yokosuka, Kanagawa
 Camp McNair, Fujiyoshida, Yamanashi
 Camp Mercy, Ginowan, Okinawa
 Camp Moore, Kawasaki, Kanagawa
 Camp Mower 34th Infantry, Sasebo, Nagasaki
 Camp Nara, Nara, Nara
 Camp Ojima, Ōta, Gunma
 Camp Otsu, Ōtsu, Shiga
 Camp Palmer, Funabashi, Chiba 
 Camp Schimmelpfennig, Sendai, Miyagi
 Camp Stilwell, Maebashi, Gunma
 Camp Weir, Shinto, Gunma
 Camp Whittington, Kumagaya, Saitama
 Camp Wood, 21st Infantry, Kumamoto
 Camp Younghans, Higashine, Yamagata
 Chibana Army Annex (later, Chibana Site), Okinawa, Okinawa
 Chinen Army Annex (later, Chinen Site), Chinen, Okinawa
 Chuo Kogyo (later, Niikura Warehouse Area), Wako, Saitama
 Deputy Division Engineer Office, Urasoe, Okinawa
 Division School Center, Kokura
 Etchujima Warehouse, Koto, Tokyo
 Funaoka Ammunition Depot, Shibata, Miyagi
 Hachinohe LST Barge Landing Area, Hachinohe, Aomori
 Hakata Transportation Office, Hakata-ku, Fukuoka
 Hamby Auxiliary Airfield, Chatan, Okinawa
 Hosono Ammunition Depot, Seika, Kyoto
 Iribaru (Nishihara) Army Annex, Uruma, Okinawa
 Ishikawa Army Annex, Uruma, Okinawa
 Japan Logistical Command (Yokohama Customs House), Yokohama, Kanagawa
 Jefferson Heights, Chiyoda, Tokyo
 Kanagawa Milk Plant, Yokohama, Kanagawa
 Kashiji Army Annex, Chatan, Okinawa
 Kishine Barracks, Yokohama, Kanagawa
 Kobe Pier No. 6, Kobe, Hyogo
 Kobe Port Building, Kobe, Hyogo
 Koza Radio Relay Annex (later, Koza Communication Site), Okinawa, Okinawa
 Kure Barge Landing Area, Kure, Hiroshima
 Lincoln Center, Chiyoda, Tokyo
 Moji Port, Kitakyushu, Fukuoka
 Nagoya Procurement (Purchasing and Contracting) Office, Nagoya, Aichi
 Naha Army Annex (later, Naha Site), Naha, Okinawa
 Naha Service Center, Naha, Okinawa
 Namihira Army Annex, Yomitan, Okinawa
 Negishi Racetrack Area, Yokohama, Kanagawa
 Okinawa Regional Exchange Cold Storage (later, Naha Cold Storage), Naha, Okinawa
 Okinawa Regional Exchange Dry Storage Warehouse (later, Makiminato Warehouse), Urasoe, Okinawa
 Onna Point Army Annex (later, Onna Site), Onna, Okinawa
 Oppama Ordnance Depot, Yokosuka, Kanagawa
 Ota Koizumi Airfield (Patton Field Air Drop Range), Oizumi, Gunma
 Palace Heights, Chiyoda, Tokyo
 Pershing Heights (Headquarters, U.S. Far East Command/United Nations Command), Shinjuku, Tokyo
 Sakuradani Rifle Range, Chikushino, Fukuoka
 Sanno Hotel Officer's Quarter, Chiyoda, Tokyo
 Shikotsuko Training Area, Chitose, Hokkaido
 Shinzato Communication Site, Nanjo, Okinawa
 South Ammunition Storage Annex (later, South Ammunition Storage Area), Yaese, Okinawa
 Sunabe Army Annex, Chatan, Okinawa
 Tana Ammunition Depot, Yokohama, Kanagawa
 Tairagawa (Deragawa) Communication Site, Uruma, Okinawa
 Tengan Communication Site, Uruma, Okinawa
 Tokyo Army Hospital, Chūō, Tokyo
 Tokyo Quartermaster Depot, Minato, Tokyo
 Tokyo Ordnance Depot (later, Camp Oji), Kita, Tokyo
 U.S. Army Medical Center, Sagamihara, Kanagawa
 U.S. Army Printing and Publication Center, Far East, Kawasaki, Kanagawa
 U.S. Army Procurement Agency, Japan, Yokohama, Kanagawa
 Yokohama Center Pier (MSTS-FE), Yokohama, Kanagawa
 Yokohama Engineering Depot, Yokohama, Kanagawa
 Yokohama Motor Command, Yokohama, Kanagawa
 Yokohama Ordnance Depot, Yokohama, Kanagawa
 Yokohama POL Depot, Yokohama, Kanagawa
 Yokohama Servicemen Club, Yokohama, Kanagawa
 Yokohama Signal Supply Depot, Kawasaki, Kanagawa
 Yokohama Signal Maintenance Depot (JLC Air Strip), Yokohama, Kanagawa
 Yokohama South Pier, Yokohama, Kanagawa
 Yomitan Army Annex, Yomitan, Okinawa
 Zama Rifle Range, Sagamihara, Kanagawa
 Zukeran Propagation Annex (later, Communication Site), Chatan, OkinawaNavy: Haiki (Sasebo) Rifle Range, Sasebo, Nagasaki
 Inanba Shima Gunnery Firing Range, Mikurajima, Tokyo
 Kinugasa Ammunition Depot, Yokosuka, Kanagawa
 Koshiba POL Depot, Yokohama, Kanagawa
 Ominato Communication Site, Ominato, Aomori
 Omura Rifle Range, Omura, Nagasaki
 Makiminato Service Area Annex, Urasoe, Okinawa
 Minamitorishima Communication Site, Ogasawara, Tokyo
 Nagahama Rifle Range, Kure, Hiroshima
 Nagai Dependent Housing Area (Admiralty Heights), Yokosuka, Kanagawa
 Nagiridani Dependent Housing Area, Sasebo, Nagasaki
 Naval Air Facility Naha, Naha, Okinawa
 Naval Air Facility Oppama, Yokosuka, Kanagawa
 Navy EM Club, Yokosuka, Yokosuka, Kanagawa
 Niigata Sekiya Communication Site, Chuo-ku, Niigata
 Shinyamashita Dependent Housing Area (Bayside Court), Yokohama, Kanagawa
 Sobe Communication Site (NSGA Hanza), Yomitan, Okinawa
 Tokachibuto Communication Site, Urahoro, Hokkaido
 Tomioka Storage Area, Yokohama, Kanagawa
 Tsujido Maneuver Area, Chigasaki, Kanagawa
 Yokohama Bakery, Yokohama, Kanagawa
 Yokohama Beach (Honmoku) Dependent Housing Area, Yokohama, Kanagawa
 Yokohama Chapel Center, Yokohama, Kanagawa
 Yokohama Cold Storage, Yokohama, Kanagawa
 Yokosuka Naval Pier, Yokosuka, Kanagawa
 Yosami Communication Site, Kariya, AichiAir Force: Ashiya Air Base (later, ATG Range), Ashiya, Fukuoka
 Asoiwayama Liaison Annex, Tobetsu, Hokkaido
 Brady Air Base (later, Gannosu Air Station), Higashi-ku, Fukuoka
 Chiran Communication Site, Chiran, Kagoshima
 Chitose Air Base, Chitose, Hokkaido
 Daikanyama Communication Site, Yugawara, Kanagawa
 Fuchu Air Station (Headquarters, USFJ/Fifth Air Force, 1957–1974), Fuchu, Tokyo
 Funabashi Communication Site, Funabashi, Chiba
 Grant Heights Dependent Housing Area, Nerima, Tokyo
 Green Park Housing Annex, Musashino, Tokyo
 Hachinohe Small Arms Range, Hachinohe, Aomori
 Hamura School Annex, Hamura, Tokyo
 Haneda Air Base (later, Postal Service Annex), Ota, Tokyo
 Hanshin Auxiliary Airfield, Yao, Osaka
 Hirao Communication Site, Chuo-ku, Fukuoka
 Itami Air Base, Itami, Hyogo
 Itazuke Administration Annex (Kasugabaru DHA), Kasuga, Fukuoka
 Itazuke Air Base, Hakata-ku, Fukuoka
 Johnson Air Base (later, Air Station, Family Housing Annex), Iruma, Saitama
 Kadena Dependent Housing Area, Yomitan, Okinawa
 Kanto Mura Dependent Housing Area and Auxiliary Airfield, Chofu, Tokyo
 Kasatoriyama Radar Site, Tsu, Mie
 Kashiwa Communication Site (Camp Tomlinson), Kashiwa, Chiba
 Komaki (Nagoya) Air Base, Komaki, Aichi
 Kozoji Ammunition Depot, Kasugai, Aichi
 Kume Jima Air Station, Kumejima, Okinawa
 Kushimoto Radar Site, Kushimoto, Wakayama
 Miho Air Base, Sakaiminato, Tottori
 Mineoka Liaison Annex, Minamiboso, Chiba
 Mito ATG Range, Hitachinaka, Ibaraki
 Miyako Jima Air Station, Miyakojima, Okinawa
 Miyako Jima VORTAC Site, Miyakojima, Okinawa
 Moriyama Air Station, Nagoya, Aichi
 Naha Air Base, Naha, Okinawa
 Naha Air Force/Navy Annex, Naha, Okinawa
 Najima Warehouse Area, Higashi-ku, Fukuoka
 Niigata Air Base, Niigata, Niigata
 Ofuna Warehouse, Yokohama, Kanagawa
 Oshima Communication Center, Oshima, Tokyo
 Rokko Communication Site, Kobe, Hyogo
 Senaha Communications Station, Yomitan, Okinawa (returned to the Japanese government in September 2006)
 Sendai Kunimi Communication Site, Sendai, Miyagi
 Showa (later, Akishima) Dependent Housing Area, Akishima, Tokyo
 Shiroi Air Base, Kashiwa, Chiba
 Sunabe Warehouse, Chatan, Okinawa
 Tachikawa Air Base, Tachikawa, Tokyo
 Tokyo Communication Site (NTTPC Central Telephone Exchange), Chūō, Tokyo
 Wajima Liaison Annex, Wajima, Ishikawa
 Wajiro Water Supply Site, Higashi-ku, Fukuoka
 Wakkanai Air Station, Wakkanai, Hokkaido
 Washington Heights Dependent Housing Area, Shibuya, Tokyo
 Yamada Ammunition Depot, Kitakyushu, Fukuoka
 Yokawame Communication Site, Misawa, Aomori
 Yozadake Air Station, Itoman, OkinawaMarines:'''
 Aha Training Area, Kunigami, Okinawa
 Camp Gifu, Kakamigahara, Gifu
 Camp Hauge, Uruma, Okinawa
 Camp Okubo, Uji, Kyoto
 Camp Shinodayama, Izumi, Osaka
 Gimbaru Training Area, Kin, Okinawa
 Ihajo Kanko Hotel, Uruma, Okinawa
 Makiminato Housing Area, Naha, Okinawa
 Onna Communication Site, Onna, Okinawa
 Awase Golf Course, Okinawa Prefecture (returned to the Japanese government in April 2010)
 Yaka Rest Center, Kin, Okinawa
 Yomitan Auxiliary Airfield, Yomitan, Okinawa (returned to the Japanese government in 2006, parachute drop training ended in March 2001)

See also
 U.S.-Japan Alliance
 United States Forces Korea (USFK)
 United States Taiwan Defense Command (USTDC)
 United States Air Force in the United Kingdom
 United States Military Government of the Ryukyu Islands
 United States Civil Administration of the Ryukyu Islands
 Operation Tomodachi
 Bell Boeing V-22 Osprey
 Amejo

References

External links

 Brochure:Okinawa Prefectural Government Washington DC Office 
 United States Forces Japan
 U.S. Naval Forces Japan
 U.S. Forces, Japan  (GlobalSecurity.org)
 Overseas Presence: Issues Involved in Reducing the Impact of the U.S. Military Presence on Okinawa, GAO, March 1998
 U.S. Military Issues in Okinawa
 LMO

Commands of the United States Armed Forces
Japan–United States relations
United States Armed Forces in Okinawa Prefecture